Riedell Shoe Inc. was founded in Red Wing, Minnesota, United States, in 1947 by a former Red Wing Shoes employee.
The founder, Paul Riedell, wanted to design widely available and affordable ice skates.
This task secured him a spot in both the ice and roller skating hall of fame.

Today

Paul Riedell's four grandsons employ and manufacture the most complete line of figure skates, speed, roller, and in-line skates. To ensure a proper fitting shoe, the factory-authorized dealers use a special fitting scale. This allows the customer to buy the exact fitting shoe.  The shoe has more than 125 production steps.  

The company faced a supply-chain shortage issue due to COVID-19 in 2020 that continued into 2021, causing a roller skate shortage.

Riedell is also the manufacturer of Moxi, a fashion-forward colorful brand of roller skates founded by pro skater Michelle “Estro Jen” Steilen. It also manufactures roller derby- and park-focused brand Antik Skates, a brand originally produced in cooperation with Mo "Quadzilla LK" Sanders before the company terminated its association with Sanders in 2018. Riedell continues to produce brands associated with Antik including Gumball toe stops, Moto bearings, and CIB wheels.

Figure skaters who wear Riedell skates

Jeremy Abbott, National Champion 
Craig Buntin, National Champion
Kurt Browning, World Champion
Michael Chrolenko, National Champion
Jean Sebastien Fecteau, National Silver Medalist
Eliot Halverson, Junior National Champion
Laura Lepistö, European Champion
Valérie Marcoux, National Champion
Parker Pennington, Junior National Champion
Susanna Pöykiö, European Silver Medalist
Elena Radionova, World, European medalist, National Champion
Jamie Salé, Olympic Champion
Jenni Vähämaa, Junior National Champion
Johnny Weir, National Champion

Sources 

http://www.twincities.com/mld/twincities/living/13730104.htm
http://www.startribune.com/120/story/240041.html

External links
 Official Riedell website
 www.eissport.at, authorized Riedell Retailer
Sporting goods manufacturers of the United States
Figure skating equipment
Companies based in Minnesota
Red Wing, Minnesota